Pandan Gardens is a housing estate which is part of Jurong East New Town in the West Region of Singapore. Immediately north of Pandan Reservoir and adjacent to Teban Gardens, it comprises exclusively public housing built by the JTC Corporation and Housing and Development Board. Its namesake road connects Jurong Town Hall Road to West Coast Road.

Geography
Like its sister town – Teban Gardens, Pandan Gardens was a patch of mangrove swamp bordering on the banks of Sungai Pandan but was subsequently reclaimed to make way for housing development projects by the JTC Corporation in 1970.

Flanked on the south side by the Pandan Reservoir and the east side by the bank of Sungai Pandan, it sits situated at the fringe of Jurong Industrial Estate as well as being on the crossroad from Singapore's city center and other parts of the island towards the various industrial estates located within Jurong, Tuas and the nearby Jurong Island.

History
The name was derived from the former Malay village in the area, Kampong Sungei Pandan. Although the land reclamation of the estate began in 1970, the actual construction did not commence until after 1975 as the land needed time to settle after being reclaimed from the mangrove swampland of the Sungai Pandan. JTC Corporation undertook the construction of the public housing blocks in the estate as a means to provide additional housings for the families of the workers from the nearby areas of Jurong Industrial Estate. This was done to help ease the housing problem due in part by the overcrowding in the then nearby Taman Jurong housing estate, which was also built by JTC in 1969.

The first housing block was completed around 1978 with a running sequence from block No.401 through to 416 (both 415 and 416 are four-storey shophouses). Currently, Pandan Gardens and Teban Gardens are satellite towns to the nearby Jurong East New Town.

Amenities
Although Pandan has a few shophouses of its own at block No. 415 and 416, it lacks a wet market like the one found in Teban Gardens, hence it gets to share the service of the market with the residents of Teban Gardens. Also located in Teban Gardens is the Ayer Rajah Neighbourhood Police Post (NPP) of Clementi Police Division at block No.43, which continues to serve the residents since its inauguration in 1985.

For entertainment and shopping, there was the nearby Jurong Entertainment Centre which has been replaced with JCube, managed by CapitaMalls Asia & IMM Shopping Mall. Nearby the two shopping centres, there is also the Jurong Regional Library which is a regional public library serving the needs of all the residents and students in the surrounding region, including Pandan Gardens.

In year 2014 & early 2015 respectively, there will be a new hospital, locating right in front of the IMM Shopping Mall, and that is, Ng Teng Fong Hospital (previously Jurong General Hospital), managed by Jurong Health.

In January 2013, the old Pandan Gardens Swimming Complex was re-opened as Playlor! Arena, which is a multi-sports complex. It features 2 astroturf courts for futsal use, 1 multipurpose court, and 1 indoor beach court.

Public transport
Pandan Gardens is accessible via public transport service by taking Bus services 51 or 143 to the Jurong East MRT station and the Jurong East Bus Interchange, while Ayer Rajah Expressway provides it with a well connected road access.

Nearest MRT station
Jurong East MRT station (1988 – present)

Nearest bus interchange
Jurong Bus Depot / Interchange (now defunct, 1978 – 1991)
Jurong East Bus Interchange (1988 – present)

Bus services serving the town
SBS Transit service number: 30, 51, 154, 197, 198, 201, 655
SMRT Buses service number: 176
Tower Transit Singapore service number: 78, 79, 143, 143M
City Transit service number: 762

Public schools
Pandan Primary School (1981–2008) merged with Fuhua Primary School in 2008.
Fuhua Primary School (1941–present)
Jurong Junior College (1981–1985) moved to new location in 1985, premises re-allocated for use by River Valley High School.
River Valley High School (1986–2004) moved to new location in 2004, premises re-allocated for use by Commonwealth Secondary School.
Commonwealth Secondary School (Nov 2006–present).

Politics

, Pandan Gardens is a part of Ayer Rajah ward within the West Coast GRC.

Together with Teban Gardens, parts of Jurong East New Town and Clementi West New Town, the four estates formed the Single Member Constituency (SMC) of Ayer Rajah SMC prior to being absorbed into the West Coast Group Representation Constituency during the 2006's election in Singapore. Dr Tan Cheng Bock was the incumbent member of Parliament, since the formation of the ward in 1980. Dr Tan subsequently retired in 2006 after making way for his successor – Mr S Iswaran. After the 2011 Singaporean general election, the Members of Parliament (MPs) within the constituency was reshuffled and Mr Iswaran was reassigned to become the MP for West Coast, while Ms Foo Mee Har took over as MP for Ayer Rajah (Now Ayer Rajah - Gek Poh).

See also
Taman Jurong
Jurong
Jurong East
Jurong Lake
Pandan Reservoir
Teban Gardens
West Coast Drive

References

External links
Photos of Pandan Reservoir

Places in Singapore
Roads in Singapore
Jurong East